The Women's 400 m T12 had its first round held on September 11, beginning at 18:05 and the A and B Finals were held on September 13 at 12:10.

Medalists

Results

References
Round 1 - Heat 1
Round 1 - Heat 2
Round 1 - Heat 3
Final A
Final B

Athletics at the 2008 Summer Paralympics
2008 in women's athletics